Donald John McGillivray (20 August 1935 – 17 August 2012) in New South Wales, Australia, usually known as D.J. McGillivray, was an Australian botanical taxonomist. He was trained in forestry, and became interested in plant taxonomy just before he transferred in 1964 to the National Herbarium of the Royal Botanic Gardens in Sydney, New South Wales.

From 1969 to 1970, he was the Australian Botanical Liaison Officer at the Royal Botanic Gardens in Kew, London.

McGillivray specialised in the Grevillea genus, and in 1993 published Grevillea – Proteaceae: A Taxonomic Revision, a definitive scientific survey of the prolific Australian plant genus.

References 

20th-century Australian botanists
Australian taxonomists
1935 births
2012 deaths
Botanists active in Australia
Australian Botanical Liaison Officers
Botanists with author abbreviations
Australian National University alumni
University of Sydney alumni
Neurological disease deaths in Australia
Deaths from Parkinson's disease
21st-century Australian botanists